3-Aminophthalic acid is a product of the oxidation of luminol.  The reaction requires the presence of a catalyst.  A mixture of luminol and hydrogen peroxide is used in forensics.  When the mixture is sprayed on an area that contains blood, the iron in the hemoglobin in the blood catalyzes a reaction between the mixture, resulting in 3-aminophthalate which gives out light by   chemiluminescence.

References

Forensic chemicals
Anilines
Carboxylic acids